Zain-ul-Hassan (born 28 October 2000) is a Pakistan-born English cricketer. He made his List A debut for Worcestershire against the West Indies A in a tri-series warm-up match on 19 June 2018.

References

External links
 

2000 births
Living people
English cricketers
Worcestershire cricketers
Place of birth missing (living people)
English cricketers of the 21st century
Herefordshire cricketers
Pakistani emigrants to the United Kingdom